Angie Lizeth Pabon Mamian (born 16 July 1997) is a Colombian visually impaired Paralympic athlete specializing in sprints. She represented Colombia at the 2020 Summer Paralympics.

Career
She lost her vision as the result of a car accident in 2013. She represented Colombia in the women's 400 metres T11 event at the 2020 Summer Paralympics and won a bronze medal.

References 

1997 births
Living people
Colombian female sprinters
Paralympic athletes of Colombia
Athletes (track and field) at the 2020 Summer Paralympics
Medalists at the 2020 Summer Paralympics
Paralympic bronze medalists for Colombia
Paralympic medalists in athletics (track and field)
21st-century Colombian women